Hans Streuli (13 July 1892 – 23 May 1970) was a Swiss politician.

Streuli was elected to the Swiss Federal Council on 22 December 1953 and handed over office on 31 December 1959. He was affiliated with the Free Democratic Party.

During his time in office, he held the Department of Finance and was President of the Confederation in 1957.

References

External links 
 

1892 births
1970 deaths
Members of the Federal Council (Switzerland)
Finance ministers of Switzerland
Politicians from Zürich